HMS Woodcock was a Royal Navy Cuckoo-class schooner. Crane & Holmes built and launched her at Great Yarmouth in 1806. Like many of her class and the related s, she succumbed to the perils of the sea relatively early in her career.

She was commissioned in 1806 under Lieutenant Isaac Charles Smith Collett. She was wrecked 13 February 1807 at Vila Franca do Campo, São Miguel in the Azores. She and her sister ship  had anchored there when a gale came up. Because of the storm it was impossible to clear the land and at 5pm Collett ran her ashore after her anchors had parted and water was continuously washing over her. Lines were passed to the shore and all her crew made it safely to land. Wagtail was wrecked three hours later.

Citations

References
 
 
 

 

1806 ships
Ships built in Norfolk
Cuckoo-class schooners
Maritime incidents in 1807
Shipwrecks of the Azores